Cristóbal is a town in the Independencia province of the Dominican Republic.

Sources 
 World Gazetteer: Dominican Republic – World-Gazetteer.com

Populated places in Independencia Province
Municipalities of the Dominican Republic